Black Force Domain is the debut album by Brazilian death metal band Krisiun.

Track listing 

Note: Tracks 11 and 12 are not available in all versions of the album.

Credits
 Alex Camargo – bass, vocals
 Moyses Kolesne – guitars
 Max Kolesne – drums

References 

Krisiun albums
1995 debut albums